Ascension Side C is the second album produced by hip-hop artist Pep Love, released December 10, 2003, under Hieroglyphics's independent label, Hieroglyphics Imperium.

Track listing

Personnel
 Pep Love – Vocals
 Jay-Biz – Guitar, bass, keyboards, samples, vocals

Pep Love albums
2003 albums